PASW may refer to

 Plant available soil water, in water science
 Predictive Analytics SoftWare (PASW), another name for SPSS statistical analysis software
 Skwentna Airport, ICAO code PASW
 Puntland Agency For Social Welfare, social welfare agency of Puntland state, Somalia